Dhanraj Mahale is a Shiv Sena politician from Nashik district. He was a member of Maharashtra Legislative Assembly representing Dindori Vidhan Sabha constituency from 2009 to 2014.

Positions held
 2009: Elected as Member of Maharashtra Legislative Assembly

References

Members of the Maharashtra Legislative Assembly
Living people
People from Nashik district
Marathi politicians
Year of birth missing (living people)
Shiv Sena politicians